Ethernet routing switch 4000 series or (ERS 4000) in computer networking terms are stackable layer-3 (routers) and layer-2 (switches) designed and manufactured by Avaya for Ethernet devices.  The ERS 4000 series consists of two major groups of devices, the ERS 4500 models and the ERS 4800 models.

History
The first set of ERS 4500 series became available in February 2007 from Nortel with the release of software version 5.0. The switches are 1U high and five models were originally available which consisted of the; 4526FX, 4550T, 4550T-PWR, 4548GT and 4548GT-PWR.

In 2008 a detailed evaluation of the systems was performed by Tolly. In 2009 The United States Department of Defense performed extensive testing of the ERS 4500 series and approved and certified these for use in the Assured Services Voice Application Local Area Network (ASVALAN) systems of the DoD. In March 2011 the Australian Department of Defense installed the ERS 4500 series with other Avaya data equipment to support their over 90,000 users. In December 2011 this system completed evaluation and certification by the U.S. Joint Interoperability Test Command (JITC) testing center for use in the United States Department of Defense as an Assured Services Local Area Network (ASLAN).

References

External links

 Avaya Ethernet Routing Switch 4800 Series Fact Sheet

ERS 4000
Network architecture